Oreské may refer to several villages in Slovakia:

Oreské, Skalica District
Oreské, Michalovce District